A Bengali Muslim wedding   A true Bengali Muslim wedding includes very few rituals and ceremonies that may span to 3 days max. In most cases, it starts with the Paka Dekha ceremony(promising of marriage). Then, nikkah(marriage registration) which is done by a kaji with a fixed denmohor(payable to wife) and it ends with the Bou Bhat ceremony that is popular as the wedding reception arranged by the groom's family. Other rituals such as engagement party, bachelor night, bridal shower, haldi, mehendi, rong khela, sangeet, aai buro vaat, biddai, receptions etc are from past Hindu inspired Bangla culture, hindi show influence or done inspired by western media. The most appropriate kind of any Muslim marriage is just the Nikkah.

Arranging the wedding
Like many non-industrial societies, in Bangladeshi culture, marriage is seen as a union between two families rather than just two people.

Within Bangladesh, arranged marriages are arguably the most common form of marriage and are considered traditional in society.

A cultural wedding is arranged by ghotoks (matchmakers), who are generally friends or relatives of the bride and groom's parents. The ghotoks facilitate introduction of the bride and groom's identity to respective parents. Families traditionally seek bride and groom matches from the same religion and good social standing, and never allow unemployed men to become grooms. In the case of an arranged marriage, if the aforementioned 'compatibility' factors are duly matched, only then is the pairing deemed an ideal match. Apart from arranged marriages there are also love marriages and semi-arranged marriages which are based more upon the preferences and wishes of the partners than strict traditional norms, though love marriage is forbidden by most of the families and inter-gender friendship is frowned upon by the society.

Once the arrangement is done, the planning of the wedding itself is done by parents. They usually start the planning the wedding venue many or few months ahead or in some cases some weeks ahead.

Pre-wedding rituals

Paka-dekha
The official engagement must follow from formal consent given by the family elders from both sides. Through a ceremony called paka-dekha or dekha-dekhi, the alliance is formalised so final wedding preparations can proceed in due course with confidence that it is indeed intentional and assured to take place. Paka-dekha is celebrated on a day when both families convene at either side's home to fix the final date and time of day of the marriage, and entertain any demands made by the groom's family in order to ensure that the bride's future is well assured. Sometimes priests may also officiate, documenting the marriage's specifications for legal/government purposes, and setting the details on paper (or in current-day digital form) and signing it from both sides' present eldest guardians.

After the legal formalities, the participants are served traditional sweets such as rasgullas and mishti doi, generally catered by the groom's side.

Following the paka-dekha, public announcements of "the auspicious alliance" are made in the localities of both sides. In modern times, this is normally done using a wedding-card.

Paan-Chini
Paan chini, chini paan or sinifaan is a tradition to give two betel leaves and areca nuts to the guests at any auspicious occasion. Thus the name was derived from the servings. 'Paan' (betel leaf) being served with silver foil signals festivity and during such propitious occasions it is also common to bring sweets. These gestures friendship and a heartening promise.

Gaye Holud (Turmeric ceremony)

This ritual is followed by Gaye Holud  or turmeric ceremonies ( gaee holud, lit. "yellowing the body") take place before the wedding ceremony. There is one turmeric ceremony for the bride and another for the groom. For the bride's gaye holud, the groom's family - except the groom himself - travel in procession to the bride's home. They carry with them the bride's wedding dress/outfit, some wedding decorations including turmeric paste (that has lightly touched the groom's body), candy/sweetmeats and gifts. They also take a large Ilish or Rohu fish decorated as a bride. After the two 'yellowing ceremonies,' the bride and groom are bathed in the water that the women had fetched from the waterway early that morning. There are local variations on this tradition, such as providing a specific number of fish to the party responsible for cooking them, and hence the best time to deliver the fresh fish to the groom's family.

The procession traditionally centers on the female relative and friends of bride, and the paste is prepared by five married women called 'Eyo-stree,' and they traditionally all wear matching clothes, usually orange in colour. The bride is seated on a sheel-nora, and the women walk encircling her, showering Ganga water drops upon the bride.

The turmeric paste is applied to the bride's skin by her friends. This is said to soften the skin, but it also colours her in the distinctive yellow hue that gives its name to this ceremony. The sweets are then fed to the bride by all involved, one at a time. Then a feast for the guests is served. Married women present may also stain each other with turmeric paste. Brides also adorn their hands, arms and feet with Alta (dye) or Henna (also known as Mehendi) on this day.

Wedding ceremony
The wedding ceremony ( bibaho/biye) follows the Gaye Holud ceremonies. The wedding ceremony is arranged by the bride's family. The groom, along with his friends and family (Borjatri), traditionally arrive later in the evening.

The groom is sent a car from the bride's side and he rides inside it with two elder male relatives, one from the bride's side and another from his own family (called his Borkorta), as well as the youngest male member from his family dressed as a groom, (called his Neet bor similar to the "best man" in western traditions). Before leaving for the wedding venue, the groom is blessed by his mother and he formally seeks her permission to begin a new life with his soon-to-be "better half". The groom's mother in a Muslim wedding leaves along with the groom and takes him to the Bride's house.

However, in contrast to the Hindu ceremony, in Muslim ceremonies the groom's mother presents the bride with jewelry and sarees and then she goes to change into her wedding saree and jewelry. Later the groom and his father and along with the bride's father then meet to sign the official mahr contract ritually giving the Bride a set amount of money as her dowry.

In a muslim ceremony the bride and groom are seated separately along with family and friends of the same gender each bride and groom with a huzur who asks both if they accept the other as their partners and if they say "qobul" (meaning I accept) then they sign the wedding document and are officially married and then seated next to each other and ask for the blessing of their family and God. Then music begins to play and food is served and women especially from the groom and bride's side of the family dance and take picture and talk with the guests.

The next morning (preferably before noon), a "Bashi Biya" or is held, and the new couple leaves for the groom's house that evening. This is known as the bidaay(lit., "goodbye or farewell") ceremony.

When the bride is greeted by the groom in the morning of "Bou Bhaat", a ritual called "Bhaat Kapor" is initiated by the groom where he gifts the bride with essential accessories of a married woman, sari and other auspicious things on a plate of silver (these items are given by husband only and not by in-laws of bride); nowadays they also use other metals like brass etc. This signifies that the groom would hence be taking care of all the needs and requirements of his bride from that day onwards. After receiving all these items from her husband, the bride takes blessing from her husband and hence begins the rituals of "Bou Bhaat".

Post-wedding rituals

Bou Bhat

The following day, i.e., the second day of the bride at her new home is celebrated as Bou Bhat as on this day, she serves rice with ghee to all her in-laws at lunch.

The evening is celebrated as a reception party, where all the distant relatives along with the close ones from the groom's side are invited and introduced to the bride. The bride's family members 'Konyajatri' also attend the reception with 'tatwo' (gifts of clothes, sweetmeats, jewellery, and all other essentials for the bride and her in-laws).

A grand feast is carried out called 'Preetibhoj'- It is a gala dinner to introduce the Bride to the society and the whole of the family. In the old days the dinner was all prepared by the family themselves. Sweets were made at home by 'Vien'. Friends and neighbors used to volunteer to distribute the food, which was usually done on banana leaves. But now the Catering Service has taken over the whole initiative.

Changes 
In the past, weddings would take place in the wife's home as community centers were not available. Many people would be invited to the wedding. In the villages, in the past, the women would sing geet, a traditional type of song sung at weddings and dance. Nowadays, modern music has taken over the geet and most of the weddings are held at community centers. Nowadays, some weddings are made as a joint program where the biye and boubhat are arranged together and jointly sponsored by the parents of both the wife and the husband.

Chittagongian Wedding
The Chittagong region has some really unique traditions than Bengali traditions of other divisions of Bangladesh. It is believed that the origin of Bengali Muslim started from Chittagong. One of the unique wedding rituals of Chittagong is "Boujōrni" (Bengali: বউজড়নী) or "Joragatha" (Bengali: জোড়াগাথা). There's another event in Chittagong's Bengali culture which takes place at the night before the bride gets to the in-laws house after marriage called "pansholla" (Bengali: পানশল্লা) and it is observed by both Muslim and Buddhist bengalis.Just like how the groom, along with his friends and family, traditionally arrive later in the evening and which is called "Borjatri" (Bengali- বরযাত্রী), in Chittagongian society there's another tradition which is similar but instead of groom side it's the bride side and it's known as "Sōari" (Sawari) (Bengali: সোয়ারী). The word "Sawar" is a word which means "ride" and it's used in South Asian communities.It is believed that because the bride used to ride on a "Palki", it is called Sawari.The "Borjatri" is known as "Boirati" (Bengali: বৈরাতী). The people from the "Boirati" get served by "Duruch pōlao" (Bengali: দুরুচ পোলাও) which is a type of Bengali pilaf originated in Chittagong. The "Duruch" is made by marinating whole chicken with Bengali spices then it gets burned a bit directly on flame and then fried in oil.And another dish is called (Bengali: নুন্নুচ) "Nunnuch" and it's a type of curry.

Gallery

See also
 Bengali Hindu wedding
 Wedding in West Bengal
 Gaye Holud
 Culture of Bangladesh
 Culture of West Bengal

References

Bangladeshi culture
Marriage, unions and partnerships in Bangladesh
Bangladesh
Marriage in Islam
Weddings by culture